Avalanche is a 1946 American action film directed by Irving Allen.

Premise
Steve, a US treasury agent, tracks down a tax evader to a ski lodge.

Cast
Bruce Cabot as Steve Batchellor
Roscoe Karns as Red Kelly
Helen Mowery as Ann Watson
Veda Ann Borg as Claire Jeremy
Regina Wallace as Mrs. Carlton Morris [Eva]
John Good as Sven Worden
Philip Van Zandt as Malone
Eddie Parks as Mr. Carlton Morris
Wilton Graff as Austin Jeremy
Henry Hayes Morgan as Duncan
Eddie Hyams as Jean
Eddy Waller as Sam

Production
Filming started February 1946. Location shooting at the Alta Ski Area began February 19, 1946, with Utah's Alf Engen and Corey Engen doing most of the skiing for the cameras. The location cast and crew of 40 stayed at the Hotel Utah, commuting to Alta each day for filming.

Albert Broccoli was the production manager. He and directed Irwin Allen were classmates at New York's Bryant High School. They teamed up on this film together and would go on to collaborate a number of times, notably as partners in Warwick Productions.

Reception
The New York Times called the film a "painful hodge podge".

References

External links
Avalanche at IMDb
Avalanche at TCMDB
Avalanche at BFI
Review of film at New York Times

1946 films
1940s English-language films
Films directed by Irving Allen
Producers Releasing Corporation films
American action films
1940s action films
American black-and-white films
Films with screenplays by Edward Anhalt
1940s American films